The Peter Jeppesen House is a house located in north Portland, Oregon listed on the National Register of Historic Places.

Description and history
The Peter Jeppesen House at 4107 North Albina Avenue in Portland, Oregon is a one and one-half story, symmetrical, hip-roofed bungalow with dormers. Its distinctions are its general European character and solid double-walled brick construction. Designed by a noteworthy Danish-born Portland architect, the bungalow is faintly reminiscent of the avant-garde work of Adolph Loos and Austrian proponents of the Arts and Crafts movement. It meets National Register Criterion C as a well-documented example of a collaboration between architect and builder; a house produced by a craftsman in his own medium for his own use. Peter Jeppesen (1861-1956), brick mason, and Emil Schacht, architect, were Danish emigres. Jeppesen was the contractor not only for numerous buildings but for a number of sidewalk construction projects around the city which can be identified today by his imprimature. Schacht (1854-1926) is noted in Oregon architectural history as the designer of the Oriental Building for the Lewis and Clark Centennial exposition of 1905. He also designed the 1912 unit of the Police Block on Oak Street in Portland which has been entered into the National Register, the Lenox Hotel and the building occupied by the Povey Brothers' well-known art glass manufactory.

Jeppesen acquired the nominated property in payment for construction work elsewhere in North Portland. He acquired the adjoining lot at the same time and developed there an income-producing, four-unit apartment building, for which plans were provided once again by his fellow countryman. The house may be seen as a tangible reminder that Albina was a settlement area for Scandinavian immigrants in the years surrounding the turn of the century. Jeppesen was active through his long and productive career in Portland in the Danish Aid Society and the Danish Brotherhood. Like other newly arrived immigrants, Peter Jeppesen was attracted to Albina, a once-separate settlement ultimately annexed to Portland, for its large concentration of Scandinavians. Albina was important as an industrial area of Portland in the boom years following the Lewis and Clark Exposition of 1905. Before its annexation by Portland in 1891, the area known as Albina was one of many small river towns along the Willamette, such as St. John's and Linnton.

See also
 National Register of Historic Places listings in North Portland, Oregon

References

External links
 - National Register of Historic Places

1909 establishments in Oregon
Arts and Crafts architecture in Oregon
Boise, Portland, Oregon
Houses completed in 1909
Houses on the National Register of Historic Places in Portland, Oregon
North Portland, Oregon
Portland Historic Landmarks